Dilili in Paris is a 2018 French, German, and Belgian computer-animated period adventure film written and directed by Michel Ocelot, with pre-production by Studio O and animation production by Mac Guff, about a Kanak girl investigating a mystery in Paris in the Belle Époque. It stars the voices of Prunelle Charles-Ambron, Enzo Ratsito, and Natalie Dessay as Emma Calvé in the original, French-language version.

The film had an invitation-only world premiere on 11 June 2018 as the opening ceremony feature, and its public premiere on June 12, at the Annecy International Animation Film Festival before being released in cinemas on October 10 in France, on October 24 in Belgium and in 2019 in Germany. It won the César Award for Best Animated Feature at the 44th César Awards.

It has been licensed for distribution in the United States and English-speaking Canada by Samuel Goldwyn Films (having already been released in Quebec by Axia Films), who released it in cinemas in 2019.

Production

Development 
Director, writer, and designer Michel Ocelot has said that two starting points for the production were his desire to create a work set in Paris, and an originally separate desire to create one on the topic of male suppression and abuse of women and girls.

He chose to combine these in a narrative which takes place in the Belle Époque, roughly in the 1900s, a decade in which several historical firsts for women in France were made.

The film depicts some of the many notable historical figures who were often present in the city at the time, and features a fictionalized version of the opera singer Emma Calvé as a supporting character. However, it simultaneously intentionally diverges from real history (and, as the director readily admits, laws of science) in its metaphorical main plot and inclusion of retrofuturist technology influenced by various works of Jules Verne and The Phantom of the Opera by Gaston Leroux.

Animation production 
The 3D rendering style continues in that used in Azur & Asmar, in that the fabric, hair, and so on of the three-dimensional models is rendered as solid colours with no shading, though it differs in that the characters' bodies (which in Azur & Asmar were shaded from a fixed angle, in a style inspired by late medieval art) are defined with a tracing effect developed from that used in Kirikou and the Men and Women.

The scenery incorporates photographs, taken by Ocelot over four years, of structures which survive from the depicted era or earlier, including the Palais Garnier, Bouillon Racine, Maxim's and the Paris sewers and objects from the collections of the Musée d'Orsay, Musée de l'École de Nancy, Musée Carnavalet, Musée Rodin, Musée du quai Branly – Jacques Chirac, and Musée Marmottan Monet, which are used directly as two-dimensional elements or for texture mapping rather than as reference material. Others were recreated in three dimensions, including the Eiffel Tower, which was based directly on architectural drawings from Gustave Eiffel's company. The digital library of the Bibliothèque nationale de France, Gallica, was used for research and for two-dimensional empherea that were incorporated directly.

Unlike Ocelot's two previous feature films, Tales of the Night and Kirikou and the Men and Women, Dilili has not been released in stereoscopic 3D.

Release 
In North America, the film was released in cinemas in Quebec on 21 December 2018 by Axia Films and on video on demand throughout Canada by them on 7 March 2019, in both instances in French with no English options. It was released in cinemas in the United States and English-speaking Canada on 4 October 2019 by Samuel Goldwyn Films, with an English-language dub.

In Australia, the film was played in cinemas as part of the 30th Alliance Française French Film Festival, which ran from 5 March to 18 April 2019 in 9 cities across the country, and it was released on DVD and video on demand in Australia and New Zealand on 10 July 2019 by Madman Entertainment, in both instances in French with English subtitles only.

In China, the film was selected for competition at the 2019 Shanghai International Film Festival.

Accolades 
At the 4th International Historical Fiction Film Festival, held in Plaisance-du-Touch in September 2018, Dilili won the Press Award for Best Feature Film. On 4 February 2019 at the 24th Lumières Awards it won Best Animated Film, and on 22 February 2019 at the 44th César Awards it won the César Award for Best Animated Feature.

References

External links 
  at Wild Bunch International Sales 
  at Michel Ocelot's official website 
  at Samuel Goldwyn Films
  at Axia Films 
 
 

2010s French animated films
2018 films
2018 computer-animated films
Animated adventure films
French animated feature films
Animated films about friendship
Animation based on real people
Belgian alternate history films
Belgian animated science fiction films
Belgian mystery films
Cel-shaded animation
César Award winners
Films directed by Michel Ocelot
Films scored by Gabriel Yared
Films set in Paris
Films set in the 1900s
French adventure films
French alternate history films
French animated science fiction films
French mystery films
2010s French-language films
German alternate history films
German animated science fiction films
Mystery animation
French historical films
German historical films
Belgian historical films
French-language Belgian films
2010s German films